The North Forty Foot Bank is a settlement which runs about  along the North Forty Foot Drain, about five to nine miles north-west of Boston Lincolnshire, England. It begins just south of the parish of Chapel Hill and runs along the drain to Toft Tunnel, just north of Hubberts Bridge. Despite its length, it only consists of the area on the north side of the drain, which was built in 1720 by Earl Fitzwilliam. 
The North Forty Foot Bank forms the boundary between Harts Grounds and Pelhams Lands.

A row of 29 brick and slate cottages were built between the North Forty Foot Bank and the hamlet of Brothertoft by Major John Cartwright to accommodate the workers of his red brick woad mill in the late 18th century. This place was then called Isatica, which is Latin for "woad". After Cartwright left Brothertoft for London, the hamlet of Isatica fell into ruin and disappeared.

Formerly extra-parochial, the North Forty Foot Bank was created a civil parish in 1858, but in 1906 became part of the civil parish of Holland Fen with Brothertoft.

Settlements within North Forty Foot Bank include:

 Pelhams Land
 Harts Ground
 Holland Fen
It was named after a hump-backed bridge over the drain which no longer exists. Hedgehog Bridge School was built in 1880 by the North-East Holland Fen School Board for 95 children. It opened on 4 April 1881, became a Council School in 1903, and a County School about 1947. It finally closed in December 1969, and was demolished in 2010.
 Toft Tunnel lies at the junction of the North Forty Foot Bank and the B1192 Langrick Road. Today it consists mainly of farms.

References

External links

Villages in Lincolnshire
Former civil parishes in Lincolnshire
Borough of Boston